Investigação Criminal (English: Criminal Investigation) is a Brazilian true crime documentary television series that follows testimonials from police investigations of some of Brazil's most shocking crimes.

Episodes

Season 1 (2012)

Season 2 (2013)

Season 3 (2014)

Season 4 (2015)

Season 5 (2016)

Release
Investigação Criminal began airing on December 4, 2012, on A&E in Brazil. On 2018, the series has been licensed to Netflix.

References

External links

2012 Brazilian television series debuts
2010s Brazilian documentary television series
Brazilian crime television series
Brazilian documentary television series
Portuguese-language television shows
True crime television series